Each novel in Willard Price's Adventure series is notable for its selection of memorable villains, whose actions sabotage the animal-collecting efforts of young adventurers Hal and Roger Hunt. To date, only one character, "Reverend" Merlin Kaggs, has appeared as a villain in more than one Hunt adventure. (Joro appears in multiple books, but only acts as a villain in one.)

List of villains

Willard Price
Willard Price's Adventure series